In 4-dimensional geometry, the icosahedral bipyramid is the direct sum of a icosahedron and a segment, {3,5} + { }. Each face of a central icosahedron is attached with two tetrahedra, creating 40 tetrahedral cells, 80 triangular faces, 54 edges, and 14 vertices. An icosahedral bipyramid can be seen as two icosahedral pyramids augmented together at their bases.

Both have Coxeter notation symmetry [2,3,5], order 240.

Having all regular cells (tetrahedra), it is a Blind polytope.

See also
 Pentagonal bipyramid - A lower dimensional analogy
 Tetrahedral bipyramid
 Octahedral bipyramid - A lower symmetry form of the as 16-cell.
 Cubic bipyramid
 Dodecahedral bipyramid

References

External links
 Icosahedral tegum

4-polytopes